Vassieux-en-Vercors is a commune in the department of Drôme in southeastern France.

The town is known for its assistance to the French Resistance during World War II, for which it was awarded the Ordre de la Libération.

Geography

The village is built on a polje of limestone and dominated by a vast Karst landscape. This polje lies on a syncline generally known as the "Plateau de Vassieux".

The Plateau de Vassieux is the site of numerous other karst phenomena, such as limestone pavements and caves, which are studied and explored by local speleology groups.

History

Vassieux-en-Vercors is home to several prehistoric archaeological sites, and has a Museum of Prehistory which was created in May 1970 after the discovery of a flintknapping workshop.

In June and July 1944, during the Second World War, the French Resistance, known as the Maquis du Vercors, staged a major uprising against the German occupation in Vercors and proclaimed the Free Republic of Vercors. It was the first democratic territory in France since the beginning of the German occupation in 1940 – the revolt was brutally suppressed. For its great acts of resistance the town was awarded the Ordre de la Libération. A memorial was built at the Col de la Chau  to remember the grim events of the Second World War, and includes a cemetery where the victims of a July 1944 German massacre are buried.

Population

Economy
The main human and economic activities are based on agriculture (livestock, timber etc.) and tourism.

See also 
Vercors Cave System
Vercors Plateau
Maquis du Vercors
Ordre de la Libération
Communes of the Drôme department
Parc naturel régional du Vercors

References

Communes of Drôme
Companions of the Liberation
World War II resistance movements